Arne Haugestad (19 June 1935 – 20 September 2008) was a Norwegian Supreme Court lawyer, best known as the leader of the Norwegian movement against the European Economic Community from 1970 to 1973 and as defender for Arne Treholt, who was convicted for espionage in 1985.

References

External links
Obituary from Dagbladet.

1935 births
2008 deaths
20th-century Norwegian lawyers
Norwegian civil servants
People from Horten